Qatar Sports Investments (QSi) is a closed shareholding organization founded in 2005 and based in Doha, Qatar. Revenues generated from ventures of QSi are reinvested into Qatar's sport, leisure and entertainment sectors. QSi is led by Chairman Nasser Al-Khelaifi and Vice Chairman Adel Mohammed Tayyeb Mustafawi, and its board of directors has three additional members. According to Una Galani, QSi "is thought to be owned by the [Qatar] finance ministry and the Qatar Olympic Committee." QSi is subsidiary of Qatar Investment Authority (QIA), the state-run sovereign-wealth fund in Qatar.

Board of directors 
Nasser Al-Khelaifi has served as chairman of QSi since 2011, and is well known for his business ventures and various leadership roles in Qatar. He is currently chairman and chief executive officer of beIN Media Group in Qatar and president of Paris Saint-Germain Football Club (PSG) in France. As a former professional tennis player, he serves as president of the Qatar Tennis Federation (QTF) and vice president of the Asian Tennis Federation for West Asia (ATF).

Adel Mohammed Tayyeb Mustafawi serves as Vice Chairman of QSi and holds various other leadership positions within the Qatari banking industry. The additional three other board members include Yousif Mohammed Al-Obaidli, Mohammad Abdulaziz Al-Subaie,Tanvirul Ahsan,and Sophie Jordan, who are also member of beIN Media Group's board of directors.

Portfolio 
QSi has become increasingly involved in international sports and in the entertainment sector, especially as a key player in the French sports market with the completed acquisition of Paris Saint-Germain and its affiliates in 2011. QSi’s portfolio also includes Burrda, a Qatari sports brand and sports and leisure apparel supplier specialized in development and customization of actions established in 2007, and NextStep Marketing, a company specialized in client representations, direct merchandising, and event management among other things. On 10 October 2022, QSi bought 21.67% of the shares of S.C. Braga for €80 million. On 10 January 2023, QSi had enquired about the pre-purchase of West Ham United for April 2023.

References

External links
 Official website

2005 establishments in Qatar
Companies established in 2005
Companies based in Doha
Holding companies established in 2005
Paris Saint-Germain F.C.
Qatar Investment Authority